Die Wolfsbrigade 44, or die Sturmbrigade 44 was a German Neo-Nazi organization,

History 
The organisation was founded in 2016. In early December 2020, the group was banned by the federal government of Germany and law enforcement officials conducted a number of police raids on locations in three states in connection with the ban. The federal German government had also banned the group's symbols, such as a skull with two grenades that had the number 44 marked on them. It was the fourth German right-wing group to be banned in 2020.

Ideology and Symbolism 
According to The Times, Wolfsbrigade 44 members identified with a war criminal, Oskar Dirlewanger, whose brutality (rape, mass murder of children, and torture) was unusual even by the standards of the Waffen-SS.

The website associated with German television news programme Tagesschau described the group as wanting to end democracy in Germany and establish a system of government based on the Nazi regime. The group was reported to have referred to the modern German state as the "Jewish Republic".

See also 
 Censorship in Germany
 Far-right politics in Germany (1945–present)

References 

2020 in Germany
Banned far-right parties
Far-right political parties in Germany
German nationalist political parties
Neo-Nazi organizations
Neo-Nazism in Germany